Cold Fell is a mountain in the northern Pennines, in Cumbria, England. Lying among the northernmost uplands of the North Pennines AONB, it is the most northerly mountain in Cumbria and is listed as a Marilyn due to its prominence of 168m.

References

Marilyns of England